Oceania Para Table Tennis Championships is a biennial sports event for para table tennis players who represent an Oceanian country. It debuted in 2011 after Asia and Oceania Para Table Tennis Championships separated.

Locations

All-time medal count
As of 2019 (This includes medals awarded in the Asia and Oceania Para Table Tennis Championships).

See also
Oceania Table Tennis Championships

References

Table tennis competitions
Para table tennis
Recurring sporting events established in 2013